(Latin for “Curious Chemical Library”) is a collection of alchemical texts first published in Latin, in Geneva, 1702 by Chouet, edited by Jean-Jacques Manget.

It is a two-volume work, each has more than 900 pages and contains 143 texts in total, which makes it one of the most comprehensive collections of alchemical texts in addition to the Theatrum Chemicum.

It is based on reprints of older publications, such as Theatrum Chemicum and Theatrum Chemicum Britannicum.

The full Latin title, including the editor’s name, on the title page: “”.

Gallery

References

1702 books
Occult books
Alchemical documents